An antiporter (also called exchanger or counter-transporter) is a cotransporter and integral membrane protein involved in secondary active transport of two or more different molecules or ions across a phospholipid membrane such as the plasma membrane in opposite directions, one into the cell and one out of the cell. Na+/H+  antiporters have been reviewed.

In secondary active transport, one species of solute moves along its electrochemical gradient, allowing a different species to move against its own electrochemical gradient. This movement is in contrast to primary active transport, in which all solutes are moved against their concentration gradients, fueled by ATP.

Transport may involve one or more of each type of solute. For example, the Na+/Ca2+ exchanger, found in the plasma membrane of many cells, moves three sodium ions in one direction, and one calcium ion in the other.

Role in Homeostatic Mechanisms 
Na+/H+ Antiporters

Antiporters, such as Na+/H+ antiporter protein, allows ions H+ and Na+ to travel across a membrane in order to change a concentration gradient. When pH within a cell is higher or lower than the optimal range it can be detrimental, therefore, the Na+/H+ antiporter detects the pH level out of range and is activated to transport ions as a homeostatic mechanism to bring the pH level back to optimal range. 

There are differences among the types of Na+/H+ antiporter families present in eukaryotes and prokaryotes. Prokaryotic organisms contain antiporter families such as NhaA, NhaB, NhaC, NhaD, NhaP, along with NapA. The most prominent functions, including pH regulation, are completed by Na+/H+ antiporter family NhaA in prokaryotes like Escherichia coli. 

Plants are sensitive to high amounts of salt, which can halt certain necessary functions of the eukaryotic organism, including photosynthesis. For the organisms to maintain homeostasis and carry out crucial functions, Na+/H+ antiporters are used to rid the cytoplasm of excess sodium by pumping Na+ out of the cell.  These antiporters can also close their channel to stop sodium from entering the cell, along with allowing excess sodium within the cell to enter into a vacuole.

See also
 Uniporter
 Symporter
 Facilitated diffusion

References

External links
 
 

Integral membrane proteins
Transport phenomena